This is a list of public art in the London Borough of Enfield.

Cockfosters

Edmonton

Enfield

Palmers Green

Trent Park

References

External links
 

Enfield
Enfield
Tourist attractions in the London Borough of Enfield